Steve Roberts (born October 13, 1964) is a former American football coach.  He served as the head football coach at Southern Arkansas University from 1994 to 1999, at Northwestern State University from 2000 to 2001, and at Arkansas State University from 2002 to 2010, compiling a career college football record of 92–98–1. After leaving Arkansas State, he became the athletic director for the Cabot, Arkansas School District in July 2011. He served there until 2016 when he became Associate Executive Director for Football at the Arkansas Activities Association.

Head coaching record

References

1964 births
Living people
Arkansas State Red Wolves football coaches
Northwestern State Demons football coaches
Southern Arkansas Muleriders football coaches
High school football coaches in Texas
People from Cabot, Arkansas
Sportspeople from Little Rock, Arkansas